Milan Machalický (born 1 June 1991) is a Czech football defender who played for Sigma Olomouc.

External links

 Guardian Football

Czech footballers
Czech First League players
SK Sigma Olomouc players
1991 births
Living people
Association football defenders